Parioglossus galzini is a species of dartfish presently known only from the island of Rapa Iti, French Polynesia.

It can be distinguished from its congeners in several ways, most notably by the complete absence of a dark lateral stripe and the presence of a membrane linking the two dorsal fins in both sexes.

References
Parioglossus galzini, a new species of ptereleotrid dartfish from Rapa Island (Teleostei: Gobioidei: Ptereleotridae) J.T. WILLIAMS & D. LECCHINI

galzini
Endemic fauna of French Polynesia
Fish described in 2004